High Time is the second studio album by Thee Michelle Gun Elephant, released in 1996.

Track listing
"brand new stone" - 4:38
"Lily" - 4:12
"Let's get love." - 4:58
"sweet MONACO" - 3:18
"chandelier" - 4:40
"blue nylon shirts (from bathroom)" - 3:23
"bowling machine" - 3:07
"Laugh the world!" - 6:09
"flash silver bus" - 2:50
"candy house (Texas style)" - 3:34
"sl(thr)ow" - 4:13
"Baby, please go home~wave'33" - 7:28

References

Thee Michelle Gun Elephant albums

1996 albums